Togaba Kontiwa Komlan (born December 31, 1990 in Niamtougou) is a Togolese international footballer who plays as a striker.

Career
He played with clubs in Togo, Tunisia, Gabon and Benin, before joining Malaysian club Sime Darby F.C. in 2013.

International career
He had played for his country national team, including a 2012 Africa Cup of Nations qualifier against Tunisia in 2011, in which he was sent off.

Komlan also played for Togo youth teams and 'B' teams.

References

External links
Profile at CS Sfaxien official website
Profile at USS Krake website
Togaba kontiwa komlan - Togoliase Striker Goal King (Youtube)

1990 births
Living people
Togolese footballers
Togo international footballers
CS Sfaxien players
Togolese expatriate sportspeople in Tunisia
Expatriate footballers in Tunisia
Togolese expatriate sportspeople in Malaysia
Expatriate footballers in Malaysia
USS Kraké players
Association football forwards
21st-century Togolese people